The Ed Mitchell Clinic is the only studio album by the Tucson-based indie rock trio Mostly Bears, having been released by Funzalo Records in 2008. The title of the album references the former British television personality Ed Mitchell, and presumably the rehabilitation clinic that he attended in order to again work at Independent Television News. The songs "Melancholyism" and "Eclipse the World (Oh, My Brain)" were issued as singles from the album.

Production 
During development and recording of the album, the band were allowed to experiment and practice with various instruments, such as the glockenspiel, the gu-zheng and the Omnichord. The experimentation also branched off into generally non-musical objects. An example can be heard on the song "Airports", where the percussion includes implementation of a bathroom sink. According to the members, they enjoyed recording in the studio bathroom because of the "natural reverberation" that occurred when playing.

Track listing 
All songs written by Mostly Bears, except "Melancholyism" which was cowritten with Fred Huang.

 "The Digital Divide" - 3:10
 "Leda Atómica" - 4:26
 "Airports" - 5:16
 "The Pharmacist" - 7:32
 "The Stationary Divide" - 3:54
 "Eclipse the World (Oh, My Brain) - 6:21
 "Melancholyism" - 4:21
 "Maslow's Hierarchy" - 3:41
 "Your Smile Decorates the Afternoon" - 4:50
 "Passeig de Gracia" - 4:10

References 

2008 debut albums